Damian Joseph McGinty Jr. (born 9 September 1992) is an Irish singer and actor. McGinty has been performing for over a decade, and a member of the group Celtic Thunder for thirteen years starting when he was fourteen. On 21 August 2011, McGinty won the Oxygen reality show The Glee Project, earning him a seven-episode guest-starring role on the hit Fox television show Glee which was later extended to 18 episodes.

Early life

McGinty was born into a Catholic family in Derry, Northern Ireland, the son of Damian Joseph McGinty and Joanne McGinty. Damian has three siblings, James, Emmett and Gemma, and is an avid Manchester United fan. He attended Lumen Christi College located in Derry, Northern Ireland. He has been performing since winning his first singing competition when he was just five years old. 

In 2006, McGinty won another competition and the following year, he made a CD which was recorded for charity. It was then passed along to Celtic Thunder producer Sharon Browne and music director Phil Coulter, who invited McGinty to sing for their first show.

Career

Celtic Thunder 
McGinty joined the newly formed Celtic Thunder in 2008 as a boy soprano at 14, and as he aged, developed a rich baritone, while still singing tenor and able to hit the high notes.  During the four years he was a member, the group did four tours of the US and Canada, six PBS TV specials, performed at the White House and sold over a million recordings, with McGinty on nine of the concert CDs and DVDs. For three of his four years, Celtic Thunder was named Top World Album by Billboard magazine. In 2015, McGinty returned as the Special Guest in the "Very Best of Celtic Thunder Tour" and now, he takes George Donaldson's place in the newest concert "Legacy". He is a full member of the group once again.

The Glee Project 
In 2011, McGinty was selected as one of the top twelve finalists, out of 40,000 contenders, in a Myspace audition search, to be on the Oxygen reality show, The Glee Project. The O visa arrived at the last moment, allowing him to compete.  He became very popular with viewers due to his humor, talent and hard work. Although his friend Cameron Mitchell, who quit (possibly saving McGinty who was in the bottom three that episode), won the Bing Fan Favorite, they sang Michael Bublé's "Haven't Met You Yet" together for the Bing video. McGinty's rendition of "Beyond the Sea" impressed the judges who selected him as co-winner with Samuel Larsen for a seven episode arc on the third season of the Fox series Glee. He announced that he was leaving Celtic Thunder for Glee.

Glee 
In the third season of Glee, McGinty played Rory Flanagan, a foreign exchange student staying with Brittany S. Pierce's family and befriended by Finn Hudson. In his premiere, the season's fourth episode "Pot o' Gold", McGinty performed two solos: Teddy Thompson's "Take Care of Yourself", which showcased his "beautiful range", and Kermit the Frog's "Bein' Green", his "simple, clear-voiced ode to being an outsider rang true and was hauntingly beautiful." His initial seven episodes were extended to the end of the third season and he returned for the fourth season Christmas episode, for a total of 18. His "smooth and lovely" rendition of "Blue Christmas" was featured on Glee: The Music, The Christmas Album Volume 2, as well as "Home" as a solo, as well as part of numerous group and duet songs. McGinty appeared in a humorous sketch about his Irish accent on a MTV "Glee-Cap"

The popular singer has almost half a million fans on Twitter.

Dancing with the Stars 
In December 2022, McGinty was announced as one of the contestants on the upcoming sixth series of the Irish version of Dancing with the Stars in 2023. He was partnered with Kylee Vincent.

Performances

Let the River Run
McGinty and Máiréad Carlin sang the Derry City of Culture anthem "Let the River Run" at the BBC TV Gala Concert Sons and Daughters. Carly Simon, who felt their rendition of her song was "absolutely stunningly wonderful," released it as a single by her Iris Records and McGinty's Walled City Records company in 2014. She also performed her song with them during the multi-star Oceana Partners Awards Gala in Beverly Hills, California.

TV specials
Between 2008 and 2011, prior to his time on Glee, McGinty was in five PBS specials as a member of Celtic Thunder: The Show, It’s Entertainment, Christmas, Heritage and Storm. In 2013, McGinty appeared in two PBS specials.  He joined former Celtic Thunder member Paul Byrom on his This Is the Moment show, and later they did a short tour. The other special The Power of Music with Ethan Bortnick was also a 2014 US tour.

Public performances
McGinty gave a "stunning performance" of the national anthem before the Kansas City Royals vs. Cincinnati Reds baseball game on 19 May 2015. He also has done all sized venues as a solo artist and is currently performing shows.

Recordings
His first EP ("Run," "This Is Your Song", "With or Without You", "Yellow" and "That's What Friends Are For") was released in December 2012 and at one point was No. 3 on the iTunes chart for US, and No. 1 in Ireland, Mexico and Peru. Various reviewers made note of his "smooth crooner voice", "rich tones" and his "golden pipes." Recently, he has been writing songs for his first album.

Charities
McGinty has lent his support to various charities including Concern Worldwide in a public service video on the need to get the children back to school in Haiti following the earthquake, The Trevor Project, Kids Beating Cancer, Oceana, and local charities.

Those Were The Days - The Tour 
The band performed a US tour between 14 October and 21 November 21, 2021. |url=https://damianmcginty.com/tours|

Cultural Ambassador 
McGinty served as "Cultural Champion" for Derry, Northern Ireland, when the city was named the UK City of Culture 2013.

Walled City Records & Audio Booth 
McGinty and his childhood friend Oran O’Carroll co-own the music companies Walled City Records and Audio Booth recording company.

Personal life
McGinty announced his engagement to Anna Claire Sneed, on 3 June 2018, via Instagram post. The pair had been dating since April 2014. On 1 June 2019, McGinty and Sneed got married in Memphis, Tennessee.

Filmography

Discography

Albums
2016: This Christmas Time
2019: Young Forever
2022 (Upcoming): Moments

EPs
2012: Damian McGinty EP
2018: No More Time EP

Singles
2012: "Run"
2014: "Let the River Run"
2016: "How Deep is Your Love"
2017: "Photograph"
2018: "Geronimo"
2019: "Home Sweet Home"
2019: "Saltwater"
2021: "City of Angels"
2022: "Like Moments Do"
2022: "Nobody Ever Grows Up"

Appearances

Celtic Thunder concerts DVD/CD
 Celtic Thunder (2008)
 Act Two (2008)
 Take Me Home (2009)
 It's Entertainment! (2010)
 Christmas (2010)
 Heritage (2011)
 Storm (2011)
 The Very Best of Celtic Thunder (2015)
 Legacy, Vol. 1 (2016)
 Legacy, Vol. 2 (2016)
 Inspirational (2017)
 X (2018)

Glee Cast

 Glee: The Music, The Christmas Album Volume 2
 Glee: The Music, Volume 7
 Glee: The Music Presents Glease

References

External links
Damian McGinty Official Website
Walled City Records
 

1992 births
Living people
Pop singers from Northern Ireland
Male television actors from Northern Ireland
Reality casting show winners
21st-century male actors from Northern Ireland